Kozluk is a town and seat of Kozluk District in Batman Province, Turkey. The town had a population of 27,825 in 2021. The mayor is Mehmet Veysi Işık (AKP).

It is divided into the neighborhoods of Ağaçlık, Aşağı Güneşli, Bahçeli, Beşevler, Çaybaşı, Değirmendere, Hamam, İslambey, Kale, Karpuzlu, Kavaklı, Kemalpaşa, Komando, Köprübaşı, Pınarbaşı, Selahaddini Eyyübi, Şemdinağa, Tepecik, Tepeüstü, Yamaçlı, Yenimahalle, Yeşiltepe, Yolaltı, Yolüstü and Yukarı Güneşli.

References

Populated places in Batman Province
Towns in Turkey
Kurdish settlements in Batman Province
Kozluk District